Nina Hartstone is a British sound editor. She won an Academy Award in the category Best Sound Editing for the film Bohemian Rhapsody.

Selected filmography 
 Bohemian Rhapsody (2018; co-won with John Warhurst)

References

External links 

Living people
Place of birth missing (living people)
Year of birth missing (living people)
British sound editors
Women sound editors
Best Sound Editing Academy Award winners